Věra Chase (born 1970) is a Czech translator and author of poetry and fiction. She lives and works in Prague.

Biography 
Chase was raised in Prague in a literary family.

Chase's work has been called playful and "intensely physical" by Radio Prague.

Chase's poetry was used as the basis for the title song on the eponymous album, Elida, by Iva Bittová and Bang on a Can All Stars. Bittová says that she was inspired by the poem and its sense of eroticism and humor.

Chase was recognized for her writing with a 1997 Czech Book award and a 1998 Knižní klub award. Also in October 1997, Chase gave a lecture at Rutgers University. Her lecture, given with Karen von Kunes was called "Smuggling Verses: Czech Poetry Today."

Books 
 Bodypainting/Telokresba, bi-lingual short-story and poetry collection, Prague 1997
 Vasen pro broskve (Passion for Peaches), a post-modern novel (in Czech), Knizni klub, Prague 1998
 Eyeberries/Bobule, bi-lingual poetry collection, Sanskriti Prathisthan, New Delhi 1999
 Hypnoskop (Hypnoscope), collection of short-stories based on dreams (in Czech), Knizni klub/Prostor, Prague 1999
 Stava (Juice), erotic poetry collection (in Czech), Labyrint, Prague 2001
 Maso a pomerance (flesh and Oranges), short-story collection (in Czech), Mlada fronta, Prague 2007
 Tricet smrt celych jahoda (Thirty death point strawberry), poetry and short-story collection (in Czech), Jitro, Prague 2011

Translation
 Anne Michaels: Fugitive Pieces from English to Czech. Odeon, Prague 2000  
 Nicola Barker: Wide Open from English to Czech, Odeon, Prague 2001

Anthologies
 Prague Tales, anthology of the Central Europe contemporary fiction, New Europe Writers 2007

References

External links 
 Vera Chase on Goodreads.com
 Sunday Mail - short-story by Vera Chase in the Cafe Irreal
 Vera Chase: Death, strawberries and a dip in the Baltic. Radio interview in English.

1970 births
Living people
Czech translators
Czech poets
Czech women poets
Translators to English
Writers from Prague
Date of birth missing (living people)